Christopher Martin Oldham (born October 26, 1968) is a former professional American football cornerback for twelve seasons in the NFL for the Detroit Lions, Buffalo Bills, Phoenix / Arizona Cardinals, Pittsburgh Steelers, and New Orleans Saints. Oldham graduated from Highlands High School in 1986.

1968 births
Living people
Players of American football from Sacramento, California
American football cornerbacks
Detroit Lions players
Buffalo Bills players
Arizona Cardinals players
Pittsburgh Steelers players
New Orleans Saints players
Oregon Ducks football players
San Antonio Riders players